"You're the Best" is a song performed by Joe Esposito and written by Bill Conti (music) and Allee Willis (lyrics), which came to prominence as the music to the All-Valley Karate Championships montage in the 1984 movie The Karate Kid in which the protagonist, Daniel LaRusso (Ralph Macchio), proves a surprisingly formidable contender.

Appearances
"You're the Best" came to prominence after being used in the 1984 film The Karate Kid. 

In 2005, the song was featured prominently in the animated series South Park, Season 9, Episode 5 ("The Losing Edge"). It is played when one of the characters (Randy Marsh) gets into a series of fights, and again over the end credits. Also, the song is dedicated to J.B.T. as it was written by the singer on the back of the CD. 

The song was played in a montage of the season 1 episode of Regular Show, titled "Death Punchies", were Rigby unleashed his death punch superpower.

The song was played in a montage of the  season 2 episode of Back at the Barnyard, titled "Mission: Save Bigfoot", where the animals climb a mountain to reach Bigfoot's home.

Criticism
Responding to years of criticism of "You're the Best" on the radio, singer Joe Esposito called into The Adam Carolla Show on April 9, 2008. The criticism was that the lyric "History repeats itself" was inappropriate because it was played during Daniel LaRusso's (Ralph Macchio) first All-Valley Tournament in The Karate Kid. Esposito revealed that the power ballad was originally intended for the Rocky III soundtrack, but was replaced by "Eye of the Tiger". It was subsequently also turned down for the Flashdance soundtrack in favor of "Maniac" by Michael Sembello. The Karate Kid's director, John G. Avildsen, liked the song so much that he used it in the movie.

References

1984 songs
The Karate Kid (franchise)
Songs written by Allee Willis
Songs written by Bill Conti
American synth-pop songs
Hard rock ballads
Joe Esposito (singer) songs